In ice hockey, the Stanley Cup Finals (also known as the Stanley Cup Final among various media) is the championship series of the National Hockey League  (NHL) to determine the winner of the Stanley Cup.  The series is played in a best of seven format, meaning that a team must win four games in order to win the series and the Cup. Games that are tied at the end of regulation time go to overtime.  In the history of the NHL, there have been 17 series which have ended on a game-winning goal in overtime. 

The first overtime Cup winning goal was scored by Bill Cook of the New York Rangers in game four of the  final against goaltender Lorne Chabot and the Toronto Maple Leafs. Mush March of the Chicago Black Hawks repeated the feat in  against Wilf Cude and the Detroit Red Wings, also in game four.

Babando scored against Chuck Rayner and the Rangers while Leswick scored against Gerry McNeil and the Montreal Canadiens.

Twice in Stanley Cup history has a team won the Cup on an overtime series winner one season, and then lost the same way the next season.  The Canadiens won the  series in overtime, only to lose it the following year to Detroit.  The Dallas Stars won the  Stanley Cup vs the Buffalo Sabres, only to lose it the following year to the New Jersey Devils.

Overtime Series Winners

References

Notes

External links
 

 
Over